Sianno  is a village in the administrative district of Gmina Brochów, within Sochaczew County, Masovian Voivodeship, in east-central Poland.

The village has a population of 81.

References

Sianno